Alireza Shoja Nouri (Persian: علی‌رضا شجاع‌نوری, born 1955) is an Iranian film producer and actor.

Filmography 
Salman the Persian (TV series) (2019-)
Negar (2017)
Muhammad: The Messenger of God (2015)
A Little Kiss (2005)
The Wind Carpet (2003)
The Fateful Day (1994)

References

External links 

Iranian film producers
1955 births
Living people
People from Shiraz
Producers who won the Audience Choice of Best Film Crystal Simorgh